Nikita Igorevich Alexandrov (born 16 September 2000) is a German-born Russian professional ice hockey forward for the Springfield Thunderbirds in the American Hockey League (AHL), while under contract to the St. Louis Blues in the National Hockey League (NHL). He was drafted 62nd overall by the Blues in the second round of the 2019 NHL Entry Draft.

Playing career

Junior 

In Germany, Alexandrov played junior hockey for Iserlohner EC in the German Development League (DNL), before being drafted 50th overall by the Charlottetown Islanders for the Quebec Major Junior Hockey League (QMJHL) in the 2017 CHL Import Draft. 

On 22 September 2017, Alexandrov made his QMJHL debut and first QMJHL assist in a 3–1 loss against the Moncton Wildcats. On 4 November 2017, Alexandrov scored his first QMJHL goal and hat-trick in a 5–4 overtime win against the Sherbrooke Phoenix. Overall, he played 66 games with 13 goals and 18 assists, helping the Islanders reach the semi-finals of the 2018 QMJHL playoffs. 

In the 2018–19 QMJHL season, Alexandrov improved on his rookie season with 27 goals and 34 assists in 64 games played. For the 2019–20 QMJHL season, he was named the alternate captain of the Islanders, playing 42 games with 23 goals and 31 assists in the shortened season.

Professional 

After being drafted 62nd overall by the St. Louis Blues in the second round of the 2019 NHL Entry Draft, the Blues signed Alexandrov to a three-year entry-level contract on 1 August 2019. 

On 29 December 2020, the Blues loaned Alexandrov to KooKoo in the Liiga. He made his professional debut in a 3–2 win against KalPa on 13 January 2021. On 23 February 2021, he scored his first professional goal in a 3–2 loss against HIFK, before finishing his season with the Utica Comets of the AHL.

International play 

Alexandrov represented Russia men's national junior ice hockey team at the 2020 World Junior Ice Hockey Championships, winning a silver medal.

Career statistics

Regular season and playoffs

International

References

External links 

 

2000 births
Living people
Charlottetown Islanders players
KooKoo players
Russian ice hockey centres
Springfield Thunderbirds players
St. Louis Blues draft picks
St. Louis Blues players
Utica Comets players